The Navan Grads are a Junior "A" ice hockey team from Navan, Ontario, Canada.  They are a part of the Central Canada Hockey League.

History
In the Summer of 1974, the residents of Navan, Ontario banded together and purchased the rights of the Eastern Ontario Junior Hockey League's Rockland Boomers.  They moved them to Navan, and the Grads were born.  In 1989, the board of directors for the Navan Grads felt that the region of Cumberland would be better suited with a team that reflected the region.  The team's name from then on was the "Cumberland Grads" from 1989 to 2017.

In the Summer of 1991, the Grads became the 10th team in the Central Junior A Hockey League and have been a member of the CJHL ever since. The Grads best season came in 2002-03 when the team finished 1st overall and were major contenders to qualify for the Fred Page Cup. The Grads won their first-ever playoff series against the Kanata Stallions defeating them 4 games to 0. The Ottawa Jr. Senators upset the Grads 4 games to 2 in the semi-finals, when game 6 went to triple overtime and Ottawa scored the game-winning goal on a penalty shot in the third overtime period. Craig Nooyan, Christian Boucher, Jason Murfitt, Jonathon Matsumoto, Brent Patry, Brendan MacIntyre, and Craig Baxter were among several returning players for 2003-04. The Grads wound up finishing second overall, and suffered a first-round upset to the Kanata Stallions in seven games, in spite of having led the series 3 games to 1.

Assistant coach Mark Grady took over Bruce Johnson's duties as head coach in 2004-05. Claude Giroux made his rookie debut with the Grads in 2005, and he was selected by the QMJHL's Gatineau Olympiques after having been passed over at the Ontario Hockey League 2005's draft.

The Grads missed the playoffs multiple times since then or have failed to make it past the first round in the CJHL playoffs.

Season-by-season record
Note: GP = Games Played, W = Wins, L = Losses, T = Ties, OTL = Overtime Losses, GF = Goals for, GA = Goals against

Championships
CCHL Bogart Cup Championships: None
Eastern Canadian Fred Page Cup Championships: None
CJAHL Royal Bank Cup Championships: None

Notable alumni
Matt Bradley
Claude Giroux
Jon Matsumoto
Daniel Taylor
Jason Akeson
Eric O'Dell

External links
Navan Grads Webpage
CCHL Webpage
EOJHL Webpage

Central Canada Hockey League teams
Ice hockey teams in Ottawa
Ice hockey clubs established in 1974
1974 establishments in Ontario